The 1957 Cleveland Indians season was a season in American baseball. The team finished sixth in the American League with a record of 76–77, 21½ games behind the New York Yankees

Regular season 
The Indians season was marked by change. Longtime Indians manager Al López took over as manager of the Chicago White Sox, and was replaced by Kerby Farrell, who had led the Indianapolis Indians to the 1956 Junior World Series crown. Eddie Stanky also became the Indians new infield coach.

Rookie Roger Maris, who was part of Farrell's Indianapolis team, joined the Indians as the team's starting center fielder. He made his major league debut against the Chicago White Sox on April 16. In 5 at bats, Maris had 3 hits. Two days later, Maris hit the first home run of his career, a grand slam off Tigers pitcher Jack Crimian at Briggs Stadium in Detroit.

In grimmer news, on May 7 Gil McDougald of the Yankees hit a pitch off Indians pitcher Herb Score in the first inning. The pitch would strike Score in the face.

Season standings

Record vs. opponents

Notable transactions 
 August 24, 1957: Vito Valentinetti was purchased by the Indians from the Brooklyn Dodgers.
 September 21, 1957: Hoyt Wilhelm was selected off waivers by the Indians from the St. Louis Cardinals.

Roster

Player stats

Batting

Starters by position 
Note: Pos = Position; G = Games played; AB = At bats; H = Hits; Avg. = Batting average; HR = Home runs; RBI = Runs batted in

Other batters 
Note: G = Games played; AB = At bats; H = Hits; Avg. = Batting average; HR = Home runs; RBI = Runs batted in

Pitching

Starting pitchers 
Note: G = Games pitched; IP = Innings pitched; W = Wins; L = Losses; ERA = Earned run average; SO = Strikeouts

Other pitchers 
Note: G = Games pitched; IP = Innings pitched; W = Wins; L = Losses; ERA = Earned run average; SO = Strikeouts

Relief pitchers 
Note: G = Games pitched; W = Wins; L = Losses; SV = Saves; ERA = Earned run average; SO = Strikeouts

Awards and honors 

All-Star Game

Farm system 

LEAGUE CHAMPIONS: Reading

Notes

References 
1957 Cleveland Indians team at Baseball-Reference
1957 Cleveland Indians team page at baseball-almanac.com

Cleveland Indians seasons
Cleveland Indians season
Cleveland Indians